Jack Lewis Obersteller (born 10 October 1988) is a footballer who plays for Welling United.

Career
Obersteller started his career as a trainee at Millwall, however he failed to make an appearance and moved on to Crawley Town before signing for Wycombe Wanderers, where he was loaned out to Grays Athletic.

He signed a one-year contract with newly promoted Exeter City in the summer of 2008.

Obersteller rejoined Grays Athletic on 28 August.

Obersteller was then released by Grays in September 2009, and joined Welling United in November 2010. He was voted players' player of the season and came second in the fans player of the season vote at the end of 2010–11.

References

External links
Wycombe Wanderers profile

1988 births
Living people
Footballers from the London Borough of Newham
English footballers
Association football defenders
English Football League players
National League (English football) players
Crawley Town F.C. players
Wycombe Wanderers F.C. players
Grays Athletic F.C. players
Exeter City F.C. players
Welling United F.C. players
Place of birth missing (living people)